Jayantilal Keshavji "Andy" Chande KBE (7 May 1928 – 7 April 2017) was a Tanzanian businessman, philanthropist and a freemason.

Background

On 10 August 2007, the Swahili translation of his book A Knight in Africa (Shujaa Katika Afrika: Safari Kutoka Bukene) was launched at the Shaaban Robert Secondary School hall, by President of Tanzania, Jakaya Kikwete. Other  figures in attendance included the Canadian High Commissioner to Tanzania, Dr Andrew McAlister

Awards
 Knight Commander of the Most Excellent Order of the British Empire, 2003
 Pravasi Bharatiya Samman, 2005

References

A Knight in Africa

External links

1928 births
2017 deaths
Knights Commander of the Order of the British Empire
Tanzanian businesspeople
Savitribai Phule Pune University alumni
Tanzanian Freemasons
Tanzanian people of Indian descent
Recipients of Pravasi Bharatiya Samman